Markus Feldmann (21 May 1897, in Thun, Canton of Bern – 3 November 1958, in Bern) was a Swiss politician, member of the Swiss Federal Council (1951–1958).

He was elected to the Federal Council on 13 December 1951 and died in office on 3 November 1958. He was affiliated to the Party of Farmers, Traders and Independents (BGB/PAI), now the Swiss People's Party.

During his office time he held the Department of Justice and Police and was President of the Confederation in 1956.

Feldmann is buried in the Schosshalden cemetery in Bern.

External links

1897 births
1958 deaths
People from Thun
Swiss Calvinist and Reformed Christians
Party of Farmers, Traders and Independents politicians
Members of the Federal Council (Switzerland)
Members of the National Council (Switzerland)
University of Bern alumni